Thelymitra cornicina, commonly called the lilac sun orchid, is a species of orchid in the family Orchidaceae and is endemic to the south-west of Western Australia. It has a single narrow, pale green leaf and up to eight lilac-tinged blue flowers with the lobe on top of the anther covered with short, finger-like calli.

Description
The lobe on the top of the anther is short and densely covered with short, finger-like yellow glands. The side lobes have mop-like tufts of a few white to lilac hairs. The flowers are insect pollinated and open on sunny days. Flowering occurs from September to November.

Taxonomy and naming
Thelymitra cornicina was first formally described in 1871 by Heinrich Gustav Reichenbach and the description was published in Beitrage zur Systematischen Pflanzenkunde. The specific epithet (cornicina) means "horn-blower", hence "horn-shaped", referring to the column.

Distribution and habitat
The lilac sun orchid grows in scrubland and forest between Perth and Hopetoun in the Esperance Plains, Jarrah Forest, Swan Coastal Plain and Warren biogeographic regions.

Conservation
Thelymitra cornicina is classified as "not threatened" in Western Australia by the Western Australian Government Department of Parks and Wildlife.

References

External links

cornicina
Endemic orchids of Australia
Orchids of Western Australia
Plants described in 1871